The United Nations Transitional Administration in East Timor (UNTAET),,  was a United Nations mission in East Timor that aimed to solve the decades long East Timorese crisis in the area occupied by Indonesian military. UNTAET provided an interim civil administration and a peacekeeping mission in the territory of East Timor, from its establishment on 25 October 1999, until its independence on 20 May 2002, following the outcome of the East Timor Special Autonomy Referendum. The transitional administration was established by United Nations Security Council Resolution 1272 in 1999.

A rarity for United Nations peacekeeping missions, UNTAET involved the United Nations directly administering the territory of East Timor. The mission's responsibilities included providing a peacekeeping force to maintain security and order; facilitating and co-ordinating relief assistance to the East Timorese; facilitating emergency rehabilitation of physical infrastructure; administering East Timor and creating structures for sustainable governance and the rule of law; and assisting in the drafting of a new constitution and conducting elections. 

UNTAET was established on 25 October 1999, the mission was led by Sérgio Vieira de Mello of Brazil (Special Representative of the Secretary-General for East Timor). The International Force East Timor
(INTERFET) transitioned to the UNTAET Peacekeeping Force (PKF) in February 2000 and was commanded by Filipino military officer Lieutenant General Jaime de los Santos (Force Commander UNTAET). UNTAET was abolished on 20 May 2002, with most functions passed to the East Timor government. The military and police forces were transferred to the newly created United Nations Mission of Support to East Timor (UNMISET).

UNTAET was wound up upon East Timorese independence but a United Nations presence in East Timor would continue through a newly established United Nations Mission of Support in East Timor (UNMISET).

Contributing nations

A coalition of nations sent troops to support the peace keeping mission. The forces were led by Australia, which provided the largest contingent and the out of theatre base for operations, supported by Portugal who sent the second largest contingent  securing the key central areas of the country, followed by New Zealand, who took responsibility for the southern West sector with supporting troops from Ireland, Fiji, Nepal, and Singapore. France also sent special forces who joined the ANZACs on the first day, as well as contingents from Brazil, Canada, Denmark, Italy, Kenya, Japan, Malaysia, Singapore, South Korea, Thailand, the Philippines, Sweden, and the United Kingdom. While the United States supported the transition authority, it did so mainly by underwriting contracts to replace destroyed infrastructure and thus avoided a direct military involvement, allowing the ANZAC led force to take the lead. The United States did, however, deploy a contingent of American police officers to serve with the International Police.

See also
 United Nations Administered East Timor
 International Force for East Timor
 Timeline of UN peacekeeping missions
 UN protectorate
 United Nations Interim Administration Mission in Kosovo, a similar arrangement for Kosovo
 UNTAET Crime Scene Detachment
 United Nations Mission in East Timor
 United Nations Mission of Support to East Timor
 United Nations Integrated Mission in East Timor

References

Further reading 
 
 Gunn, Geoffrey C. and Reyko Huang (2004; 2006), New Nation: United Nations Peacebuilding in East Timor (Faculty of Economics, Nagasaki University, Southeast Asia Monograph Series No.36. (reprint, author, Tipografia Macau Hung Heng Ltd., Macau) 
 
 Pemper, Tammy (2019). Scorched Earth: Peacekeeping in Timor during a campaign of death and destruction. Big Sky Publishing. A biography from a peacekeeper's perspective, based on actual events in the days leading up to UNTAET.

External links

 Archived official website
 The United Nations and East Timor – A Chronology
 UNTAET Mission Summary
 A Brief History of Australian Army Operations in East Timor, 1999–2005
 Archived web-site of first Transitional Administration
 Archived web-site of second Transitional Administration

 01
Government of East Timor
History of East Timor
1990s in East Timor
2000s in East Timor
States and territories established in 1999
States and territories disestablished in 2002
1990s establishments in East Timor
2000s disestablishments in East Timor
1999 establishments in Indonesia
1999 establishments in Southeast Asia
2002 disestablishments in Southeast Asia
1267
History of Timor
East Timor and the United Nations